Connie Wible Murray (born October 13, 1943) is an American politician.

Education 
In 1965, Murray received a Certificate of Oral Hygiene from Temple University. In 1975, Murray earned a BA degree in English literature from Loyola College. In 1980, Murray earned a Jurius Doctorate degree from the University of Maryland School of Law.

Career 
Murray served in the Missouri House of Representatives from the 135th district from 1991 to 1997.

Awards 
 1992 Administration of Justice Award.
 1994 Judicial Conference Legislative Award.

Personal life 
On May 4, 1995, Murray married Jarret Holland Murray, an insurance businessman, at the House chambers in Jefferson City, Missouri. Murray's ceremony was conducted by Missouri Supreme Court Chief Justice Ann K. Covington.
In the 1990s, Murray resided in Springfield, Missouri.

References

External links 
 Connie Wible Murray at house.mo.gov

1943 births
Living people
Republican Party members of the Missouri House of Representatives
Politicians from Springfield, Missouri
Politicians from Tulsa, Oklahoma
Women state legislators in Missouri